Ezra Durgin (9 August 1796 – December 1863) was a member of the Wisconsin State Assembly.

Biography
Durgin was born in 1796 near Concord, New Hampshire. He married Temperance Nutter and moved to what late became Exeter, Wisconsin and later Manitowoc County, Wisconsin and Rock County, Wisconsin. He was involved in the lumber business. Durgin died in December 1863.

Career
Durgin was a member of the Assembly during the 1848 session. He was a Democrat.

References

External links

Politicians from Concord, New Hampshire
People from Green County, Wisconsin
People from Manitowoc County, Wisconsin
People from Rock County, Wisconsin
Democratic Party members of the Wisconsin State Assembly
1796 births
1863 deaths
19th-century American politicians